The Wilmès I Government was a caretaker Federal Government of Belgium, led by Prime Minister Sophie Wilmès, the first ever female Prime Minister of Belgium.

History 
The creation of the Wilmès Government was announced on 26 October 2019, when previous Prime Minister Charles Michel announced he would be succeeded by Sophie Wilmès ultimately on 1 November 2019, effectively forming a new government. Charles Michel left his post as he had been elected to become the next President of the European Council as from 1 December 2019 and wanted to have sufficient time to prepare for his role as President of the European Council hence leaving already by November.

The Wilmès Government was governing as a caretaker government, until a new cabinet was formed based on the results of the federal elections of 26 May 2019, for which negotiations were still ongoing. Hence the government was a continuation of the centre minority coalition cabinet of Christian Democratic and Flemish (CD&V), the Open Flemish Liberals and Democrats (Open Vld) and the Reformist Movement (MR) which together constituted the Michel II Government. On 16 March, the Wilmès Government was given support by several opposition parties to handle the coronavirus outbreak in Belgium, for which the cabinet is going to be supported by a majority in parliament by granting it special powers under the form of the Wilmès II Government. The opposition parties were giving support for three months to take corona measures, with a possible further three month extension, are the socialists (sp.a & PS), the greens (Groen and Ecolo), the cdH and DéFI, leaving only the N-VA and the PVDA/PTB and Vlaams Belang in the opposition.

Composition
The composition of the government was similar to that of the Michel II Government, with the only differences being Sophie Wilmès taking over the role of Charles Michel as Prime Minister and David Clarinval coming in to replace Wilmès as Minister of Budget, Civil Service, National Lottery and Scientific Policy.

Changes in composition
 On 30 November 2019, Philippe Goffin took the place of Didier Reynders, taking over the portfolios of Foreign Affairs and Defence. Reynders left his post to take up the role of European Commissioner for Justice in the Von der Leyen Commission. David Clarinval was appointed the new Deputy Prime Minister for the Mouvement Réformateur

References

Belgian governments
2018 establishments in Belgium
Cabinets established in 2019
Cabinets disestablished in 2020